Jean Luc Razakarivony (born September 10, 1975) is a Malagasy former swimmer, who specialized in breaststroke events. He is a three-time Olympian (1996, 2000, and 2004), a multiple-time Malagasy record holder in the 100 and 200 m breaststroke, and a member of Genève Natation 1885, based in Geneva, Switzerland.

Razakarivony made his first Malagasy team, as a 21-year-old, at the 1996 Summer Olympics in Atlanta. There, he failed to reach the top 16 final in the men's 100 m breaststroke, finishing in forty-first place with a time of 1:07.34.

On his second Olympic appearance in Sydney 2000, Razakarivony edged out Saudi Arabia's Ahmed Al-Kudmani to earn a third spot and fifty-fifth overall in heat one of the 100 m breaststroke by exactly a tenth of a second (0.10), establishing his own lifetime best at 1:05.97.

Razakarivony swam for his third time in the 100 m breaststroke at the 2004 Summer Olympics in Athens. He received a Universality place from FINA in an entry time of 1:07.25. He challenged seven other swimmers in heat two, including Kyrgyzstan's Yevgeny Petrashov, who also competed with the same number of Games. He posted a time of 1:07.74 to save a sixth spot over Petrashov by four hundredths of a second (0.04). Razakarivony ended his third and final Olympic stint with a fifty-fourth-place effort on the first day of preliminaries.

References

1975 births
Living people
Malagasy male swimmers
Olympic swimmers of Madagascar
Swimmers at the 1996 Summer Olympics
Swimmers at the 2000 Summer Olympics
Swimmers at the 2004 Summer Olympics
Male breaststroke swimmers
People from Antananarivo